The 2017 Australian GT Championship was the 21st running of the Australian GT Championship, a CAMS-sanctioned Australian motor racing championship open to FIA GT3 cars and similar cars as approved for the championship. The championship commenced on 2 March 2017 at the Adelaide Street Circuit and concluded on 19 November at Wakefield Park, with two rounds held in New Zealand.

Following the success of the previous year, a second series for GT3 cars, the Australian Endurance Championship was also contested. A third series for older-specification GT3 and GT4 class cars, the CAMS Australian GT Trophy Series, was also held.

The Australian GT Championship events were held in support of five V8 Supercar events. The Australian Endurance Championship shared an event with the Shannons Nationals, another with V8 Supercars, and its final two rounds were staged at Hampton Downs and Highlands Motorsport Park, both owned by series owner Tony Quinn. The Australian GT Trophy Series was contested exclusively at Shannons Nationals events.

The Australian GT Championship was won by Geoff Emery driving an Audi R8 LMS.

Series
The 2017 season included three separate series:
 CAMS Australian GT Championship, shorter races for current-specification GT3 cars.
 CAMS Australian Endurance Championship, longer endurance races featuring multiple drivers and current-specification GT3 cars.
 CAMS Australian GT Trophy Series, shorter races for older-specification GT3 and GT4 cars.

All competitors are able to enter the Australian GT Championship and the Australian Endurance Championship, and all were eligible to win the championships outright, however only older-specification cars could enter the Australian GT Trophy Series.

Race calendar
The Australian GT Championship is contested over five rounds, the Australian Endurance Championship over four rounds and the Australian GT Trophy Series over five rounds. Each race, with the exception of the Australian Grand Prix round of the Australian GT Championship, includes at least one compulsory timed pit stop.

Australian GT Championship

Australian Endurance Championship

Australian GT Trophy Series

Australian GT Championship

Teams and drivers

Race results

Points system
Points are awarded as follows:

Championship standings

Australian Endurance Championship

Teams and drivers

Race results

Points system
Points are awarded as follows:

Championship standings

Australian GT Trophy Series
The Australian GT Trophy Series was won by Steve McLaughlan driving an Audi R8 LMS Ultra.

References

External links

Australian GT Championship
GT
Australian Endurance Championship